Glorioso may refer to:

Glorioso Islands, French islands in the Indian Ocean
Glorioso, an 18th-century Spanish ship of the line (see Voyage of the Glorioso)
Richard Glorioso (born 1943), retired United States Air Force colonel and Republican politician
O Glorioso ("The Glorious One"), nickname of Brazilian football club Botafogo de Futebol e Regatas
O Glorioso ("The Glorious One"), nickname of Portuguese sports club S.L. Benfica
El Glorioso, nickname of the Tigres del Licey Dominican baseball team

See also
Glorious (disambiguation)